Saubhagya Singh Shekhawat (सौभाग्य सिंह शेखावत; 22 July 1924 – 10 December 2016) was an Indian Rajasthani language writer.

Though moderately educated, he is known as a high-ranking scholar who has contributed to almost all the research journals of Rajasthan. He is known as an expert on the ancient Dingal language. He died on 10 December 2016 at the age of 92 in his hometown.

Bibliography 

 Rajasthani Nibandh Sangrah (1974)
 Rajasthani Sahitya Sampada (1977)
 Poojan-Panv Kavisara (1987) 4
 Rajasthani Sahitya, Sanskriti Avam Itihas (1991)
 Jeenmata
 Rajarshi Madan Singhji Danta
 Bhaktvar Raghuveer Singhji Javali Jeevan Parichay
 Rajasthani Varta Bhag-3 (1957)
 Rajasthani Varta Bhag-4
 Rajasthani Varta Bhag-5
 Rajasthani Varta Bhag-7
 Rajasthani Veer Geet Sangrah Part I
 Vinhe Raso (1966)
 Balvad Vilas
 Rajasthani Veer Geet Sangrah Part IV
 Jada Mehdu Granthavali
 Doongarsi Ratanu Granthavali(19
 Swatantrata senani Dungji Jawaharji (1972)
 Kaviraj Bankidas Aashiya Granthavali Part I (1985)
 Kaviraj Bankidas Aashiya Granthavali Part I (1987)
 Marwad Ra Umravan Ri Varta
 Isardas Namak Vibhinna Charan Kavi
 Charan Sahitya ki Marm Parikshaक्षा
 Rajasthani shodh Sansthan ke Hastlikhit Granthon Ki Soochi Part III
 Rajasthani Sahitya aur Itihas Sambandhi Prakashit Granthon Ki Soochi
 Shekhawati Ke Veer Geet
 Malani Ke Gaurav Geet
 Kahvat Vilas
 Kaviraj Bankidas
 Veer Bhogya Vasundhara (1998)
 Gaj Uddhar Granth
 Rajasthani Shabd-Kosh part I Sanshodhan Parivardhan
 Rasile Raj Ra Geet (co-Editor)
 Raja Ummed Singh Sishodia Ra Veer Geet
 Aitihasik Rukke Parvane
 Ajeet Vilas
 Mataji Ri Vachnika
 Dr Tessitory Ka Rajasthani Granth Sarvekshan
 Suryamal Mishan Visheshank
 Veer Satsai Rajasthani Teeka
 Rajlok Sahitya
 Mohnot Nansi
 Ranrol (2002)
 Akhil Bhartiya Kshtriya Mahasabha New Delhi satabdi samaroh Smarika
 Patra Dastavej Edited by Dr Mahendra Singh Nagar and Kr Dharmveer Singh Shekhawat
 Patra Prakash
 History of Thikana Khood and Danta

Shekhawat has served as:
 Editor, Suprabhat (1944–45)
 Editor, Sangharsh (1947–1952)
 Editor, Rajasthani Shabd-Kosh (1982–1984)
 Executive committee member, Rajasthani Bhasha Sahitya Avam Sanskriti Academy, Bikaner
 Member Advisory Board, Sri ShardulShekhawati Sodh Sansthan, Kali
 Member Advisory Board, Sri Khicchi Shodh Sansthan, Indroka, Jodhpur
 Chairman Rajasthani Bhasha Unnayan avam Samvedhanik Manyta Samiti (formed by Government oF Rajasthan), 1990
 Chairman Rajasthani Bhasha Sahitya Avam Sanskriti Academy Bikaner (Government of Rajasthan) for two terms
 State Nominee and Member Advisory Board for Rajasthani, Sahitya Akademi New Delhi

Awards 

 Maharana Kumbha Award 1983–84 (Maharana Mewar Foundation, Udaipur)
 Hajari Mal Banthiya Award ( Calcutta)
 Prithvi Raj Rathore Award (Rajasthani Bhasa Sahitya Evam Sanskriti Academy, Bikaner)
 Rati Ghati Puruskar (Bikaner) 
 PhoolChand Banthiya Puruskar Culcutta 1973,
 Vishishtha Sahityakar Puruskar, Rajasthan Sahitya Academy Udaipur 1976,
 Rajasthan Ratnakar, Deep Chand Jain Puruskar New Delhi 1978, 
 Rajasthani Gadya Puruskar, Rajasthani Bhasha Sahitya Sangam, Bikaner 1978–79,
 Maharana Kumbha Award Maharana Mewar Foundation Udaipur, 1983–84,
 Dwarika Nidhi Sahitya Samman, Jaipur 1992
 Puranmal Misra Sanskriti Puruskar, Shekhawati Sahitya kala evam Sanskriti, Academy, Laxmangarh, Shekhawati, 1996,
 Kunwar Kartar Singh Gurjar Sahitya Samman, 1996 Jai Sahitya Sansad, Jaipur,
 Sahitya Samman, Shri Bhairon Singh Shekhawat Amrit mahotsava Samiti, 1998,.
 lakhotiya Puruskar Aashrani Ramniwas Lakhotiya Trust New Delhi (2001), Sahitya Samman, 
 Rajpoot Chetna Evam Jagran Manch, Bikaner 2001,
 Sahitya Samman Rajpoot Sabha Sikar 2001
 Palaki Siropav ro Kurab Maharaja Gaj Singh Jodhpur 2003,
 Goenka Rajasthani Sahitya Samman 2011

References 

1924 births
2016 deaths
20th-century Indian essayists
20th-century Indian linguists
People from Sikar district
Rajasthani-language writers
Rajasthani people
Writers from Rajasthan